Libraries and librarians are recurring elements in fiction. Below is a list of notable fictional literary works, films and television episodes that are either set, either wholly or partially, in a library or in which a librarian features prominently. The year refers to the original release date of the work.

Books and comics

(Alphabetized by author's surname)
 In Hiro Arikawa's Japanese light novel series Library War (2006-ongoing) (also the title of the series' first book), the Japanese government enacts a sweeping censorship law, which spawns a decades-long conflict with forces seeking to protect libraries.
 Batgirl as Dr. Barbara Gorden, who is depicted as working as librarian in Gotham City's Public Library.
 Jorge Luis Borges' short story, "The Library of Babel" (1941),  depicts a universe consisting of a library of hexagonal rooms.
 In Ray Bradbury's science fiction novel, Fahrenheit 451 (1953), books are outlawed and some rebels fight back by memorizing works, making themselves living libraries.
 Jen Swann Downey's The Ninja Librarian book series, which begins with The Ninja Librarians: The Accidental Keyhand (2014), follows a sword-wielding girl who apprentices herself to a secret society of warrior librarians whose job it is to protect writers from getting in trouble for the viewpoints and ideas they publish.
 Umberto Eco's first novel, The Name of the Rose (1980), is a murder mystery revolving around the existence of a book in the library of a Benedictine monastery.,
 Scott Hawkins' The Library at Mount Char has protagonists who refer to themselves as librarians.
 Stephen King's novella, The Library Policeman (September 1990), is synopsized at King's official website as follows: "When a man forgets to return some books he borrowed from the library while writing a speech, and later accidentally destroys them, the phantom librarian who lent him the books sends the library policemen to terrorize him".
 Audrey Niffenegger's The Time Traveler's Wife features Henry, who works in the Newberry Library, and also appears in the film adaptation.
 Garth Nix's Lirael (2001) features Lirael, an assistant librarian. 
 In Anders Jacobsson and Sören Olsson's Sune series, Karin Andersson is a librarian. 
 The Elizabeth Peters' novel The Seventh Sinner (1972) features Jacqueline Kirby, a librarian. 
 In Terry Pratchett's Discworld series, The Librarian of the Unseen University is a recurring character that first appears in 1983. 
 Philip Roth's Goodbye, Columbus features a librarian who is racist. 
 In J. K. Rowling's Harry Potter series, the castle of Hogwarts features a library. Madam Irma Pince is the librarian at Hogwarts during the series.
 Brandon Sanderson's young adult comic novel Alcatraz Versus the Evil Librarians (2007) is the first in a series about a young teen with an unusual skill, who finds himself battling against a cult of evil librarians who secretly rule the world.
 Neal Stephenson's novel Snow Crash features a virtual librarian. 
 In Jo Walton's Among Others, Allison Carroll is a librarian.

Film and stage

(Alphabetical by series or title)
 In Angels and Demons (2009), the sequel to The Da Vinci Code (2006), Robert Langdon visits the Vatican Library and the Vatican archives several times to carry out research on the meaning and significance of various symbols.  
 The Breakfast Club (1985), five high school students serve a Saturday detention in the school's library.  
 Citizen Kane stars a librarian.
 The Day After Tomorrow (2004), a group of people takes shelter from sudden freezing cold in the New York Public Library, burning books to keep warm.T
 Desk Set (1957) stars Katharine Hepburn as the head of a reference library; she and her staff are seemingly threatened with replacement by an early computer invented by Spencer Tracy's character.
 Doctor Strange (2016) features the Kamar-Taj library, which houses ancient books about powerful magical lore.
 Fahrenheit 451 (1966), an adaptation of Ray Bradbury's book.
 Foul Play features Gloria Mundy, a shy San Francisco librarian.
 From Hell (2001) starring Johnny Depp, contains scenes representing the British Library.
 The opening scenes of Ghostbusters (1984) include a haunted library with three librarian ghosts, filmed at the iconic central branch of the New York Public Library.
 Harry Potter films Harry Potter and the Philosopher's Stone (2001), Harry Potter and the Chamber of Secrets (2002), Harry Potter and the Goblet of Fire (2005), and Harry Potter and the Half-Blood Prince (2009) feature the Hogwarts Library.
 Indiana Jones & The Last Crusade features a trip to a Venetian Library and stereotypical male librarian.
 It's a Wonderful Life features Mary Hatch Bailey, an  "old maid" librarian in Pottersville. 
 John Wick: Chapter 3 – Parabellum (2019) features a scene that takes place in the New York Public Library.
 In The Librarian franchise, Flynn Carsen (Noah Wyle) is hired by the New York Metropolitan Library, and recruited into an ancient clandestine order of Librarians. He's introduced in the first original film of the franchise, The Librarian: Quest for the Spear (2004), where he is entrusted with the role of protecting the historical, and often magical, contents of a secret section of the library. He returns in The Librarian: Return to King Solomon's Mines (2006) and in The Librarian: Curse of the Judas Chalice (2008).
 The Lord of the Rings: The Fellowship of the Ring (2001), Gandalf travels to Gondor to research in Lord Denethor's Library the Ring in Bilbo's possession.
 The Disney/Pixar film Monsters University (2013) features a librarian.
 The Mummy (1999) features Evelyn Carnahan, the female lead who is a clumsy librarian. She also appeared in the two sequels of this film.
 The female lead in The Music Man is a librarian at the Madison Public Library and the musical features the song "Marian the Librarian".This Broadway show won five Tony Awards and its cast album won the first Grammy Award for Best Musical Theater Album and spent 245 weeks on the Billboard charts. It was also made into a film of the same name that was nominated for six Academy Awards and won the Golden Globe Award for Best Motion Picture – Musical or Comedy.
 The Name of the Rose (1986), an adaptation of Umberto Eco's novel.
 The Omen (2006) contains scenes representing the Vatican library.
 Only Two Can Play (1962) stars a Welsh librarian and occasional drama critic.
 The Party Girl (1995) stars Mary, a party girl who discovers she wants to be a librarian.
 The Pagemaster features Mr. Dewey, an eccentric librarian. 
 The Prince & Me (2004) contains scenes representing a Danish Library.
 The Public stars librarian Stuart Goodson, who is comfortable with the homeless people who use his public library every day. 
 Oblivion (2013) takes place in an imagined future amidst the ruins of New York, including those of the New York Public Library.
 Red (2010) has Frank Moses (Bruce Willis), a former black-ops CIA agent, visiting a New York college library to look up a book after he obtained a postcard with a Dewey classification number on it.
 The musical She Loves Me (1963) includes the song "A Trip to the Library".
 Something Wicked This Way Comes (1983) features a librarian.
 Storm Center (1956) includes protagonist, Alicia Hull, a small town librarian.
 The Time Machine (2002), a film adaptation of H. G. Wells's novel, features a holographic artificial intelligence librarian at the New York Public Library in the year 2030 and afterwards.
 UHF (1989) features the character Conan the Librarian.

Games

(Alphabetized by series or title)
 The Elder Scrolls V: Skyrim features a librarian.
 Genshin Impact (2020) features a playable librarian character named Lisa. 
 The 2020 adventure game, The Librarian, features a librarian.
 Metro 2033 features librarians as characters.
 Monkey Island II: LeChuck's Revenge features an unnamed female librarian.

Television

(Alphabetical by series, then chronological by episode)
 The Buffy the Vampire Slayer (1997–2001) character, librarian Rupert Giles, serves as Buffy Summers' mentor and surrogate father figure; beneath the school library lies a secret gateway to the demon realms. 
 An episode of CSI: Crime Scene Investigation features Aaron Pratt, an autistic librarian. 
In the Doctor Who episode "Silence in the Library" (2008), Donna Noble and Tenth Doctor visit a planet which is a 51st-century book repository simply called "The Library".
 In the Doctor Who episode "Journey to the Centre of the TARDIS" (2013), Clara visits the TARDIS library.
 In Game of Thrones, several libraries figure prominently: in Oldtown at The Citadel, maintained by maesters; in King's Landing at the Red Keep, maintained by septons; at Winterfell (where in the season 8 "Battle of Winterfell", Arya Stark is stalked by wights), maintained by House Stark's maestre; and at the Wall at Castle Black, maintained by Maester Aemon Targaryen of the Night's Watch; additionally, Shireen Baratheon uses books from her collection at Dragonstone to teach the imprisoned Davos Seaworth to read.
 Hilda features Kaisa, the librarian of the Trolberg Library and a witch.
 The Inspector Morse episode "Twilight of the Gods" (1993), featured the Bodleian Library
 In one episode of Mira, Royal Detective, Mira and her father Sahil operate a bookmobile.
 In "Once Upon A Time", Belle is a princess-turned-librarian.
 Orange Is the New Black features Tasha “Taystee” Jefferson, a librarian at Litchfield Penitentiary.
 Outlander, season 2 (2016), contains scenes representing the library at the Palace of Versailles in Paris. It is here that Jamie and the Minister of Finance, Joseph Duverney play chess, and where the Comte St. Germain poisons Claire.
 Episodes of Parks and Recreation feature Tammy, a librarian 
 In Person of Interest seasons 1 through 3 (2011), the enigmatic billionaire Harold Finch operates secretly from within an abandoned library.
 She-Ra and the Princesses of Power features George and Lance, two gay historians who run a family library. 
 Silent Library was a television game show with a public library setting that aired on MTV from 2009 to 2011. 
 In the Star Trek: The Original Series episode "All Our Yesterdays" (1969), Captain Kirk, McCoy, and Spock are transported back in time by the sole remaining inhabitant of a doomed planet: the librarian Mr. Atoz.
 In the Stranger Things (2016-2017), in the third episode of both seasons 1 and 2, the librarian of the Hawkins Public Library helps characters research information.
 The Big City Greens episode "Quiet Please" features an unnamed librarian at a city library. 
 The Crazy Ones features Flora, a drunk librarian. 
 The Librarians (2007-2010) is an Australian television comedy series that has a librarian as the protagonist.
 The Librarians (2014-2018), a continuation of The Librarian film series, features several characters who work for The Library.
 In The Twilight Zone episode "The Obsolete Man" (1961), a totalitarian state, having banned books, sentences a librarian to death for the crime of being obsolete.
 The We Bare Bears episode "The Library" features an unnamed female librarian.
 Welcome to the Wayne features Clare Rhona, head librarian of The Stanza.

Other

 "Ms Dewey", a sexy librarian character for the Bing search engine. 
 Pearl, a librarian action figure, modeled on Seattle Public Library librarian Nancy Pearl.

See also

 Librarians in popular culture
 New York Public Library in popular culture
 Films set in libraries category

References

Further reading
 
 
 
 
 
 

History of fiction
 
Librarians
 
Lists of librarians